The 2001–02 season was West Bromwich Albion's 106th season in The Football League. The team had lost in the playoff semi-final to Bolton Wanderers in 2000–01, meaning that they would be playing in the Football League First Division for the ninth consecutive season, their 33rd season in total at the second level of English football.

Albion won eight and drew two of their last ten league games and sealed promotion by beating Crystal Palace on the final day of the season. The club's success was built on a solid defence; although only 12th in the division in terms of goals scored, they conceded just 29 times, the fewest goals the club has ever conceded in a league season of 42 or more games. The team kept a club record 27 clean sheets (24 of which were in the league), including 17 1–0 wins (15 in the league).

The £7.5 million East Stand at the club's home ground, The Hawthorns, was completed in time for the start of the season. It replaced the old 'Rainbow Stand', which had been built in 1964.

Kit
West Bromwich Albion retained the previous season's kit, manufactured by Patrick and sponsored by the West Bromwich Building Society.

Players

First-team squad

Left club during season

Reserve squad

Match results

Legend

Football League First Division

FA Cup

League Cup

See also
2001–02 in English football

Notes

References

West Bromwich Albion F.C. seasons
West Bromwich Albion